The Metropolitan Council is the legislative body of the consolidated city-county government of Nashville, Tennessee and Davidson County.

The Council has 40 members, 35 of which are district council representatives, and five of which are council members at-large. If an at-large member resigns or dies before serving a full four-year term, the member's seat remains vacant until the next election. If a district council members resigns or dies more than eight (8) months before the end of their four-year term, a special election is held to fill the seat. At-large council members are elected by the entirety of the area the metropolitan government encompasses. The Metropolitan Council is the 3rd largest in the United States, behind the Chicago City Council and the New York City Council. The Historic Metro Courthouse, 1 Public Square, is where the Council meets.

Under the Metropolitan Charter, members must be over the age of 25 and have lived within Davidson County for a year at the beginning of their terms. Members must also have lived in the district they represent for six months, and they must continue to reside in that district for the duration of their terms. In 2019, according to The Tennessean, annual salaries for council members increased for the first time since 2005 from $15,000 to $23,100. The members elected by districts represent 15,000 to 17,000 residents each, and all Metro Council members serve part-time. According to the Charter as currently amended, members are elected to no more than two terms consecutively, not including any partial term to which they may have been elected.  However, district member and at-large member are considered to be separate offices for the purposes of this provision.

In the 2015 municipal elections, two amendments to the Metropolitan Nashville Charter which would have increased term limits for members of the Council, both at large and district-wide to three consecutive terms, as well as reducing the size of the council to 27 members, were proposed. Both amendments failed with Davidson County voters.



President of the Council
The popularly elected vice mayor is the President of the Metropolitan Council and serves as its presiding officer, but is not a member of the Metro Council and does not vote except to break ties. The vice mayor, a part-time position, is paid $25,230 annually.

Members elect a president pro tempore to serve in the absence of the Vice Mayor, and a deputy president pro tempore once the president pro tempore becomes presiding officer due to the Vice Mayor's death or resignation. Members of the Metro Council who act as presiding officer during the Vice Mayor's absence retain their right to vote on all resolutions and ordinances.

Jim Shulman is the incumbent vice mayor. Dave Rosenberg is the president pro tempore.

Operations

Two-thirds of the Metropolitan Council are required to constitute a quorum before the business of the council can be conducted. The council holds regular meetings each first and third Tuesday of each month. In addition, with 48 hours' written notice, a special meeting may be called by the mayor or the vice mayor. It may also be requested by the majority of the council, which would require 21 votes in favor of the meeting. Meetings are broadcast live on Metro 3 and are archived on the Nashville government website.

The mayor may veto resolutions and ordinances passed by the Metropolitan Council, but the veto can be overridden with a two-thirds majority of the Council. With three-fourths of the entire council in favor, and not subject to veto, investigations may be conducted by the whole council or its committees.

Committees

Size reduction

In 2005, mayor Bill Purcell called for cutting the number of legislators in the council down to 20 in a proposal in which fifteen seats would be elected by districts and five seats would remain at-large. In 2006 the Metro Charter Review Commission scheduled a public hearing on the council's size. In a poll by The Tennessean, 21 councillors favored keeping the council as it is, and nine favored a reduction in the size of the council.

Dissidents said that if the size of the council were to be reduced, being elected could become a matter of who can raise the most money, and special interests may get involved. Other concerns voiced included council members not being able to get in contact with their constituents, the council becoming less ethnically diverse, and council membership changing from a part-time to a full-time job. Councilwoman Amanda McClendon said a reduction in size may make it easier to pass legislation.

Current membership, 2019–2023

Historical Membership

2015–2019 Memberships

*Loniel Greene served as District 1 councilman from September 2015 until his resignation on January 29, 2016. A special election to name his replacement is scheduled for August 2016. Nashville Attorney and WTVF-TV Legal Analyst Nick Leonardo, who narrowly lost to Greene in the prior race, ran again with numerous endorsements by community organizations including The Nashvillian newspaper winning the election for District 1 Councilmember.

*David Briley served as vice mayor until March 6, 2018 when he became acting mayor upon the resignation of Mayor Megan Barry. Council member Sheri Weiner was initially named interim vice mayor at that time with council member Burkley Allen later being appointed interim vice mayor. Briley was subsequently elected to complete Barry's unexpired term as mayor on May 24, 2018. Council member Jim Shulman was ultimately elected to complete Briley's unexpired term as vice mayor on September 6, 2018.

*Karen Johnson served as District 29 Councilwoman from 2015–2018.  She was elected to the countywide office of Davidson County Register of Deeds in 2018.  Delishia Porterfield was elected March 19, 2019 in a special election to fill the remainder of the term until the August 1, 2019 General Election for Metro Councilmember District 29.

Membership, 2011–2015

Membership, 2007–2011

Membership, 2003–2007

* Member resigned or died before the next election date. On December 18, 2004, Chester Hughes died from brain cancer. Chris Whitson and Tommy Bradley resigned on September 20, 2005 and March 16, 2006, respectively. Michael Kersetter resigned April 5, 2006 to run for a seat on the Metro school board. Chester Hughes was replaced by Walter Hunt. Jim Hodge replaced Michael Kerstetter. Robert Duvall replaced Tommy Bradley. Emily Evans replaced Chris Whitson. On September 1, 2006, Amanda McClendon became a Judge of the Second Circuit Court for the 20th Judicial District and was replaced by Anna Page.

Membership, 1999–2003

**Ronnie Steine resigned in 2002, and Howard Gentry became the interim vice mayor until later being elected vice mayor in 2003.

Membership, 1995–1999

References

External links
Metropolitan Council main page
Metropolitan Council rules and procedures
The Metro Charter
A Nashville City Paper article on 2003 council member salary raises
A The Tennessean article on the council meeting on council size changes
 - An article from The Tennessean on member resignations
Metro Council, 1999–2003
Metro Council, 1995–1999

Tennessee city councils
Davidson County, Tennessee
Government of Nashville, Tennessee
County governing bodies in the United States